The qualifying round for the 1984 European Football Championship consisted of 32 teams divided into seven groups; three of four teams and four of five teams. The qualifying round was played at various times between May 1982 and December 1983, with some groups concluding earlier than others.

Qualified teams

{| class="wikitable sortable"
|-
! Team
! Qualified as
! Qualified on
! data-sort-type="number"|Previous appearances in tournament
|-
|  ||  ||  || 1 (1960)
|-
|  || Group 1 winner ||  || 2 (1972, 1980)
|-
|  || Group 2 winner ||  || 0 (debut)
|-
|  || Group 3 winner ||  || 1 (1964)
|-
|  || Group 6 winner ||  || 3 (1972, 1976, 1980)
|-
|  || Group 5 winner ||  || 0 (debut)
|-
|  || Group 4 winner ||  || 3 (1960, 1968, 1976)
|-
|  || Group 7 winner ||  || 2 (1964, 1980)
|}

Seedings
The draw took place on 8 January 1982 in Paris, France. 32 teams were drawn from the five pots into the seven groups. France qualified automatically as hosts. Teams qualified to the final tournament are in bold.

Overview
There were a number of extremely close finishes in some of the qualifying groups. In Group 2, Portugal edged out the Soviet Union by beating them narrowly 1–0 on a penalty by Rui Jordão in Lisbon on the final day. Meanwhile, in Group 5, again on the final day, Romania managed to hold on for a tense 1–1 draw in Bratislava and qualify at the expense of Czechoslovakia. A major surprise in this group was the poor performance of then-World Cup holders Italy, who were rebuilding after the retirement of many of their 1982 heroes and quickly dropped out of contention.

Another surprise was the qualification of Denmark in Group 3 at the expense of England. Having conceded a 2–2 draw at home against the Three Lions, the hitherto unknown Danes performed well in their other qualifiers and capped their impressive campaign with a 1–0 win at Wembley, while England dropped a point at home against Greece that ultimately cost them the qualifying berth.

There was also heartbreak for Northern Ireland in Group 6. After managing to beat hot favourites West Germany both home and away earlier in the campaign, they came within 11 minutes of making it to France, but could only look on as Gerd Strack scored a crucial late winning goal for the West Germans in their own final fixture at home to Albania.

In Group 7, The Netherlands thought they had done enough to qualify, given that their closest rivals Spain went into the final match needing to beat Malta by eleven goals in order to qualify. And when Spain went in at half-time in Seville leading the Maltese minnows by a margin of only 3–1, the Dutch could have been forgiven for assuming they were home and dry. Spain, incredibly, then proceeded to score nine more goals in the second half, the last of them coming in the 83rd minute from Juan Señor, to book an unlikely passage to the finals. UEFA has since changed its rules: all teams now play their final game at exactly the same time and date, so that none of the teams has an advantage. Also, overall goal difference is now de-emphasized in the tie-breakers in favour of head-to-head results.

Things were tightest of all in Group 4, where Wales, Bulgaria and Yugoslavia were all in contention until the final few seconds of the last match in the group, between the latter two teams in Split. A draw would have put the onlooking Welsh through to the finals, but just moments after Bulgaria had squandered a glorious chance to score the winning goal and seal their own qualification, Yugoslavian defender Ljubomir Radanović wrote himself into Balkan footballing history with the 90th-minute header that sent him and his teammates to France.

Tiebreakers
If two or more teams finished level on points after completion of the group matches, the following tie-breakers were used to determine the final ranking:
 Greater number of points in all group matches
 Goal difference in all group matches
 Greater number of goals scored in all group matches
 Drawing of lots

Summary

Groups
Four groups of five teams and three groups of four teams competed for qualification for UEFA Euro 1984. The teams played home and away matches against the other teams nations in their group. The seven teams that acquired the most points to win their respective group qualified for the main tournament, joining the host nation France.

Group 1

Group 2

Group 3

Group 4

Group 5

Group 6

Group 7

Goalscorers

References

External links
 UEFA Euro 1984 at UEFA.com

 
1984
UEFA Euro 1984
1982–83 in European football